The  International League season took place from April to September 2007.

The Richmond Braves defeated the Durham Bulls to win the league championship.

Attendance
Buffalo - 572,635
Charlotte - 311,119
Columbus - 507,155
Durham - 535,056
Indianapolis - 586,785
Louisville - 653,915
Norfolk - 464,034
Ottawa - 126,894
Pawtucket - 611,379
Richmond - 356,028
Rochester - 473,288
Scranton/WB - 590,326
Syracuse - 380,152
Toledo - 596,675

Playoffs
The following teams qualified for the postseason:  Durham Bulls, Richmond Braves, Scranton/Wilkes-Barre Yankees, and Toledo Mud Hens.

Division Series
Durham (South Division Champion) 3, Toledo (West Division Champion) 0
Richmond (Wild Card) 3, Scranton/Wilkes-Barre (North Division Champion) 1

Championship series
Richmond (Wild Card) 3, Durham (South Division Champion) 1 Richmond played in their first Triple A Championship Game against the Sacramento River Cats. They lost to Sacramento. They following season they played their final season in Richmond before relocating to Gwinnett County and being renamed the Gwinnett Braves.

References

External links
International League official website 

 
International League seasons